Gordon Onslow Hilbury Burt (27 November 1893 – 9 July 1968) was a photographer who pioneered the use of photography in advertising in New Zealand. He was born on 27 November 1893.  He died in Lower Hutt on 9 July 1968.

References

1893 births
1968 deaths
New Zealand photographers